Pierre Seghers (5 January 1906, in Paris – 4 November 1987, in Créteil) was a French poet and editor. During the Second World War he took part in the French Resistance movement.

Career 
He founded, among other things, the famous line of books Poètes d’aujourd’hui (Contemporary poets) in 1944, which published 270 books of poets both famous and unknown (such as an anthology of modern accursed poets in 1972, Poètes maudits d'aujourd'hui: 1946-1970).

Together with François Lachenal, Paul Eluard and Jean Lescure, he gathered in 1943, the texts of many poets of the French Resistance, which he published in Les Editions de Minuit under the title: L’honneur des poètes.

Among the prizes and orders he received, he was made a commander of the Légion d'honneur and in 1976 Laureate Of The International Botev Prize.

He was doctor honoris causa of Saint Andrews University, Scotland.

He is buried at the Montparnasse Cemetery.

An exhibition on his life and work took place in the Musée du Montparnasse in Paris in 2011. A detailed catalogue was then published.

Bibliography 

Poetry
 Bonne-Espérance, Éditions de la Tour, 1939
 Pour les quatre saisons, Poésie 42
 Le chien de pique, Ides et Calendes, 1943
 Le domaine public Poésie 45 et Pariseau Montréal
 Jeune fille, Éditions Seghers, 1947
 Menaces de mort, La presse à bras, 1948
 Six poèmes pour Véronique, Poésie 50
 Poèmes choisis, Éditions Seghers, 1952
 Le Cœur-Volant, Les Écrivains réunis, 1954
 Racines, Interc. du Livre, 1956
 Les pierres, Interc. du Livre, 1956
 Chansons et complaintes, Tome I, illustrated by Jean Pierre Serrier, Éditions Seghers, 1959
 Chansons et complaintes, Tome II, Éditions Seghers, 1961
 Piranèse, Éditions Ides et Calendes, 1961
 Chansons et complaintes, Tome III, Éditions Seghers, 1964
 Dialogue, 1965
 Dis-moi, Ma vie, 1973
 Le Temps des merveilles, Éditions Seghers, 1978

Prose
 Richaud du Combat, A. A. M. Stols, 1944
 L'Homme du commun,Poèsie 44
 Considérations, ou Histoires sous la langue, Collection des 150
 La Résistance et ses poètes, 1940-1945, Seghers 1974

References

External links 
 Publishing house homepage
 Biography of Seghers, in French
 Video : Pierre Seghers in 1967, he is interviewed (in French) about his new collection Poètes d’aujourd’hui. Archive of the Télévision suisse romande

Writers from Paris
1906 births
1987 deaths
French editors
Burials at Montparnasse Cemetery
20th-century French poets
French male poets
Prix Guillaume Apollinaire winners
Commandeurs of the Ordre des Arts et des Lettres
Commandeurs of the Légion d'honneur
20th-century French male writers
French male non-fiction writers